Geary Brewing Company is a Craft Brewery currently located in Portland, Maine, USA. It was incorporated in October 1983 by David and Karen Geary. As of March 2017, Geary Brewing Company is now owned and operated by Robin and Alan Lapoint of Freeport, Maine. 

At the time of its inception in 1983, there were only 13 so-called microbreweries in the United States, almost all of them in California and the Pacific Northwest. Geary's, as it is more commonly known, was one of the first new microbreweries during America’s late 20th-century brewing renaissance.

In the winter of 1984, David traveled to England and Scotland for training and research of brewing. With the help of Peter Maxwell Stuart, a Scottish nobleman and brewer who arranged introductions and itineraries, he worked in half-dozen small commercial breweries from the highlands of Scotland to the south coast of England. There were fewer resources for craft brewing at the time, so upon returning to the States, David and Karen began the long and difficult process of creating a business plan finding appropriate real estate, specifying equipment and raw materials, and raising the capital necessary to begin brewing. Once enough money was collect and two years had passed, the size and design of the brewery began to take shape.

Through hiring Alan Pugsley (would go on to be a co-founder of Shipyard Brewing Company), an English biochemist. At the time Pugsley was one of the top brewing consultants in North America, under the direction of David and Karen the recipe for Geary’s Pale Ale was created using classic elements from some of Britain’s best breweries. Brewing began in the fall of 1986 and once David sampled and approved of the Geary's Pale Ale, the brewery was ready. On December 10, 1986, the first pints of Geary's Pale Ale were sold; signaling the arrival of New England's first microbrewery. Their beer offerings eventually expanded to some 10 beers, with some being limited time seasonals. In 1987 D. L. Geary Brewing Company's first big distribution break occurred when supermarket chains, Hannaford and Shaw's started carrying their beers. It was not until 1990, that they distributed outside of the United States Northeast.

In 2006 Geary’s London Porter won a New York Times blind taste test when put against 24 other Porters. During the later 2000's the beer market and the number of breweries has grown exponentially in Maine. The formerly known, D.L. Geary Brewing Co. had been overshadowed by newer and hipper breweries, leading to lower production. According to numbers from Maine's Bureau of Alcoholic Beverages and Lottery Operations, Geary's beer production dropped by 34.5 percent from 2011 to 2015, while craft beer production as an industry had increased from 2011 to 2015. Increased competition along with decreased production, a devastating loss of one of the founders, Karen Geary, and a general loss of passion eventually led to the sale of the brewery new owners in March of 2017.

References 

Beer brewing companies based in Maine
Companies based in Portland, Maine